"Teardrops" is a song by Welsh singer Shakin' Stevens, released in November 1984 as the second single from his Greatest Hits album. It peaked at number 5 on the UK Singles Chart. The song features The Shadows' Hank Marvin on lead guitar and was later included as a bonus track on the remastered version of Lipstick, Powder and Paint on The Epic Masters box set.

Release 
A limited edition double seven-inch single was released, titled the 'Shaky Party Pack'. The bonus single included two medley remixes of Stevens' previous UK hits. The first was a medley of "Cry Just a Little Bit", "You Drive Me Crazy", "A Rockin' Good Way", "Give Me Your Heart Tonight", "A Love Worth Waiting For" and "Green Door". The second was a medley of "I'll Be Satisfied", "A Letter to You", "I'll Be Satisfied" (Reprise), "Shirley", "Oh Julie", "It's Late", "Marie, Marie", "Hot Dog" and "This Ole House". For the twelve-inch single, these two medleys were combined to form the B-side, lasting almost nine minutes long.

Track listings 
7": Epic / A 4882 (UK)

 "Teardrops" – 3:59
 "You Shake Me Up" – 2:54

Double 7": Epic / DA 4882 (UK, titled 'Shaky Party Pack')

 "Teardrops"
 "You Shake Me Up"
 "Megamixofhits" (Part 1)
 "Megamixofhits" (Part 2)

12": Epic: / TA 4882 (UK)

 "Teardrops" – 4:45
 ""You Shake Me Up" – 2:54
 "Megamixofhits" – 8:48

Charts

Year-end charts

Certifications

References 

1984 singles
1984 songs
Shakin' Stevens songs
Epic Records singles
Song recordings produced by Christopher Neil